Martha Connors is a fictional character appearing in American comic books published by Marvel Comics. She is usually depicted as a supporting character of Spider-Man, and the wife of Dr. Curt Connors, also known as the Lizard. Much of her character's story revolves around her constant suffering, yet perseverance through her husband's constant transformations. Martha was later injected with Curt's Lizard Formula to cure her of a deadly virus, which also mutated her into an anthropomorphic lizard.

Publication history
The character was created by Stan Lee and Steve Ditko and first appeared in The Amazing Spider-Man #6 (November 1963).

Fictional character biography
Sometime before her first appearance, Martha met and married surgeon and biologist Curt Connors. Together they had a son named Billy and their life seemed perfect. However, Curt, an amputee, was looking for a way to regrow lost limbs. Despite Martha warning him about the dangers of experimenting on himself, fearing for his safety, Curt created a Lizard Formula and injected himself with it, transforming into a feral lizard monster. Martha later ran into Spider-Man, who already had an encounter with the Lizard, and told him what really happened, prompting the wall-crawler to track down and cure Curt, albeit temporarily.

At one point, Martha and Billy were kidnapped by the Maggia branch led by Silvermane, who wanted Curt to decipher an ancient tablet. Once again, Curt transformed into the Lizard and it took the combined effort Spider-Man and the Human Torch to save Martha and Billy, who were happily reunited with a cured Curt. Although Curt would continue to transform into the Lizard time and time again, Martha would not abandon him.

Sometime later, Curt mentions that Martha contracted cancer and had died due to the complications of her surgery.

In a lead-up to the Dead No More: The Clone Conspiracy storyline, Martha is revived by Miles Warren, along with Billy, who had also died, to persuade Curt to work for him. Martha still works at New U Technologies. When New U Technologies suddenly breaks out in a melee, Martha and Billy are taken away by Curt, who claims that he can cure their Carrion Virus. Martha and Billy are injected with the Lizard Formula, which saves their lives, but also mutates them into anthropomorphic lizards.

Martha and her family continue to live peacefully in the sewers, getting occasional friendly visits from Peter Parker and Mary Jane Watson, although Billy desires to live a normal life and begins to rebel against Curt.

Other versions

Ultimate Marvel
In the Ultimate Marvel Universe, Martha is renamed Doris Connors and had long since divorced her husband due to his experiments. She receives a letter from her husband explaining his actions.

Newspaper Strips
In the Spider-Man newspaper strips, Martha is renamed Lydia Connors.

In other media

Television
 Martha appeared in the 1960s Spider-Man series, voiced by Peg Dixon. She is just named Mrs. Conner in this series.
 Martha appears in the 1994 Spider-Man series, voiced by Giselle Loren. This version is named Margaret Connors.
 Martha appears in The Spectacular Spider-Man, voiced by Kath Soucie. This version is a geneticist like her husband and is initially welcoming to Peter Parker and Gwen Stacy, whom the Connors hired for internship. When Peter sold a photo of Spider-Man battling the Lizard to the Daily Bugle in the episode "Natural Selections", Martha lost all trust in Peter and fired him, even though Peter left no mention of Curt being the Lizard. In the episode "Blueprints", Norman Osborn learns what happened between Peter and Martha when he has dinner with her and others to discuss an upcoming project. Upon some persuasion from Osborn, Martha eventually rehires Peter. In the episode "Final Curtain", Martha and her family are forced to move to Florida after Miles Warren blackmails Curt by threatening to reveal his Lizard experiments to the board of education if Curt revealed Miles' involvement with the supervillain community.

Film
Martha Connors was supposed to appear in The Amazing Spider-Man played by Annie Parisse, but her scenes were cut from the final film. It is implied throughout the movie that she is divorced from her husband.

References

External links
 Martha Connors at Marvel Wiki

Anthropomorphic reptiles
Characters created by Stan Lee
Characters created by Steve Ditko
Comics characters introduced in 1963
Fictional characters from Florida
Fictional characters with superhuman durability or invulnerability
Fictional human–animal hybrids
Fictional reptilians
Marvel Comics animals
Marvel Comics female characters
Marvel Comics characters who can move at superhuman speeds
Marvel Comics characters with accelerated healing
Marvel Comics characters with superhuman strength
Marvel Comics hybrids
Marvel Comics mutates
Spider-Man characters